Group 8 consisted of six of the 50 teams entered into the European zone: Iceland, Liechtenstein, Lithuania, Macedonia, Republic of Ireland, and Romania. These five teams competed on a home-and-away basis for two of the 15 spots in the final tournament allocated to the European zone, with the group's winner and runner-up claiming those spots.

Standings

Results

Notes

External links 
Group 8 Detailed Results at RSSSF

8
1996 in Icelandic football
1997 in Icelandic football
1996–97 in Liechtenstein football
1997–98 in Liechtenstein football
1996 in Lithuanian football
1997 in Lithuanian football
1996–97 in Republic of Macedonia football
1997–98 in Republic of Macedonia football
1996–97 in Republic of Ireland association football
1997–98 in Republic of Ireland association football
1996–97 in Romanian football
Romania at the 1998 FIFA World Cup
1995–96 in Liechtenstein football
1995–96 in Republic of Macedonia football